Azatan is a village in the Akhuryan Municipality of the Shirak Province of Armenia. The Statistical Committee of Armenia reported its population was 5,697 in 2010, up from 4,838 at the 2011 census.

Demographics

References 

Communities in Shirak Province
Populated places in Shirak Province